Fred "Red" Harris (28 February 1910 – 20 October 1979) was a lawyer, Texas politician and Dallas County judge. He served as an officer in the United States Navy during World War II and, in later life, became a painter of scenes from the American Western frontier.

Early life and education 
Harris was the son of Charles Frederick Harris and Marie Calcote Harris. He was christened Charles Frederick Jr., but his parents called him Fred and many others called him Red because of his red hair. Harris graduated from Oak Cliff High School in 1927. After high school, he attended Baylor University in Waco, Texas on an athletic scholarship and participated on the football, basketball, track and baseball teams. Harris was recruited to play professional baseball by the St. Louis Browns and briefly played second base for their minor league franchises in Wichita Falls, Texas and Fort Smith, Arkansas. He returned to Waco and received his bachelor of law degree in August 1932.

Early career 
Harris received his law license in November 1932 and began to practice law in Dallas. In 1934, he ran for a seat in the Texas House of Representatives as a Democrat and was elected after defeating the incumbent George Parkhouse in the party primary. In 1935, after the end of his first legislative session in Austin and never having liked his given name of Charles, he had his name legally changed to Fred Red Harris to differentiate himself from another prominent Dallas resident who was also named Fred Harris. Harris resigned from his seat in the House at the end of 1941 to become a Dallas County commissioner.

Military service 
Harris decided to join the Navy in mid-1942 and his wife was appointed to complete his term as county commissioner. He was trained and commissioned as a lieutenant junior grade in the Naval Reserve. His initial assignment was as a flight deck officer on the escort carrier  during the final stages of her pre-commissioning and her initial voyages in the Atlantic theatre.

In late 1943, Harris was reassigned to be a flight deck officer on the carrier . He participated in her commissioning and throughout her wartime service in the Pacific theatre. Harris was awarded the Bronze Star and Purple Heart after Franklin was struck by a Japanese Kamikaze in October 1944. He received the Navy Cross and a second Purple Heart after Franklin was attacked by a Japanese dive bomber in March 1945.

In late 1945, Harris was promoted to lieutenant commander and released from active duty.

Post-war career 
Harris was elected to the Texas Senate in 1946. He ran for lieutenant governor in 1950, but lost to Ben Ramsey in the Democratic primary. After Earl Huddleston resigned from the House of Representatives in June 1951, Harris won his seat in a special election. He retired from Texas state politics in January 1953.

In 1963, Harris was appointed as a judge in Dallas County. In his spare time, he took up oil painting. His works were displayed in several one-man art shows and later published in a book. Harris and his wife moved to Waco in 1976 after his retirement.

Personal 
Harris married Gussie Merle Hubert on 16 October 1935. They had three daughters.

References

Further reading 
 
 

1910 births
1979 deaths
W. H. Adamson High School alumni
Baylor Law School alumni
Lawyers from Dallas
Members of the Texas House of Representatives
20th-century American naval officers
United States Navy personnel of World War II
Recipients of the Navy Cross (United States)
Texas state senators
Painters from Texas
People from Waco, Texas
20th-century American politicians
20th-century American lawyers
Military personnel from Texas